Bryan Stanley Valentine Timms (born 17 December 1940) is a former English first-class cricketer. Timms was a wicket-keeper and right-handed batsman who played for Hampshire from 1959 to 1968 and for Warwickshire from 1969 to 1971.

Biography 
Born 17 December 1940 at Ropley, Hampshire, Timms made his first-class debut for Hampshire in 1959 against Cambridge University. He represented Hampshire in 208 first-class matches, with his final first-class appearance for the county coming against Surrey in 1968. Timms also played one-day cricket for Hampshire, with his one-day debut coming in the 1965 Gillette Cup against Norfolk. From 1965 to 1968, Timms played 9 one-day matches for Hampshire, with his final one-day game for the county coming against Warwickshire in the 1968 Gillette Cup.

In his 208 first-class matches for Hampshire, Timms scored 3,236 runs at a batting average of 15.70, with 7 half centuries and a single century score of 120 against Oxford University in 1966. He took 402 catches and made 60 stumpings for Hampshire. In one-day cricket, Timms scored 118 runs for Hampshire at an average of 19.66, with a highest score of 55 against Sussex in 1967.

After the 1968 season Timms joined Warwickshire. He made his first-class debut for Warwickshire against Northamptonshire in 1969, and represented Warwickshire in 24 first-class matches, with his final first-class appearance for Warwickshire coming against Gloucestershire in the 1971 County Championship. He also represented Warwickshire in one-day cricket, making his debut for the county in the 1969 Player's County League against Kent. He played 7 one-day matches for Warwickshire, with his final one-day game for the county coming against Lancashire in the 1970 John Player League.

In his 24 first-class matches for Warwickshire, Timms scored 421 runs at an average of 16.19, with a highest score of 61 against Essex in 1969. He took 54 catches and made 10 stumpings. In one-day cricket for Warwickshire, He scored 34 runs at an average of 17.00, with a high score of 29, took 5 catches and made a single stumping.

External links
Brian Timms at Cricinfo
Brian Timms at CricketArchive
Matches and detailed statistics for Brian Timms

1940 births
Living people
People from Ropley
English cricketers
Hampshire cricketers
Warwickshire cricketers
Wicket-keepers